JSC Ukrainian Postal Service or Ukrposhta is the national postal service of Ukraine. It is a public company with 100% state ownership due to its strategic importance. In 1999–2015 it was a unitary enterprise of the government of Ukraine. Ukrposhta has been a member of Universal Postal Union since 1947 and the owner of national stamp issuing enterprise "Ukraine Stamps".

History

Ukrposhta operated within the Soviet Ministry of Telecommunications (Administration of Postal Communication) as its republican branch on territory of the Ukrainian SSR and was centered in Moscow. The Ukrainian SSR did not have a separate system of telecommunications and was completely integrated within the Soviet system of telecommunications. As part of the Gorbachev reforms (perestroika and decentralization, see Union of Sovereign States), in 1991,  Ukrtelecom was created in Soviet Ukraine which took over administration of all means of communication such as postal and signal.

In 1994 Ukrposhta started to operate as a separate business entity following the restructuring of Ukrtelecom, after which Ukrposhta has been providing postal service, while Ukrtelecom has been providing telephone and telegraph services.

In July 1998 Ukrposhta was reformed again on a government request.

It is currently managed by the Ministry of Infrastructure of Ukraine and the Cabinet of Ministers of Ukraine decrees.

Ukrposhta's activities are regulated by the Law of Ukraine "On Postal Service" (in force since 4 October 2001) and other laws including regulations of the UPU.

Structure

In 2016 Ukrposhta revealed company overview and statistics of 2015:

27 Regional administrative directories;
12 000 post offices (including 9 000 in rural areas);
73 000 employees (Postmen – 32.0; operators −13.7; Sorters – 2.6)
200.9 million of postal items annual processing and delivery, including: 
15.4 million insured items;
11.1 million orders;
74.0 million pensions delivered;

Direct fetching to 15 million subscriber mailboxes;
Subscription distribution: 500.7 million copies a year;
Transporting 31 tons annually; total vehicles mileage covering 72 million km;

Impact of events in 2014 

The events of 2014 narrowed the scope of the company's geographical activities: in April of this year, Ukrposhta ceased operations in the Crimea and Sevastopol, and in December left the territories of the unrecognized DPR and LPR. On the basis of its infrastructure in these regions, the “Post of Crimea” (from April 21), “Post of Donbass” (from December 2) and “LNR Post” appeared respectively. For reference, as of the beginning of 2014, Ukrposhta had 553 post offices and 221 vehicles to transport mail to Crimea. About 4.7 thousand people, or about 5% of its workforce, were involved in the directorates of Ukrposhta on the peninsula.

Starting from March 27, 2014, postal items sent by "Ukrposhta" from the mainland of Ukraine are not accepted by the postal service of Crimea and Sevastopol and are returned back. Under these circumstances, "Ukrposhta" is not able to forward postal items to the Crimean peninsula. Given the current situation, Ukrposhta has suspended the acceptance of postal items to Crimea.

See also
 Postage stamps and postal history of Ukraine
 Donbass Post - the postal administration of the unrecognized self-declared Donetsk People's Republic
 Post of Crimea - the postal administration that covers the territory of Crimea, which is internationally recognized as part of Ukraine, but it is annexed by Russia in 2014.

References

External links
Official Website
Google Maps location
Online tracking system
Fee calculator (in Ukrainian)
Chrome Tracking extensions
Branch Locator List (in English)
Branch Locator Map (in Ukrainian)
bulk Online tracking system

Ukraine
Government-owned companies of Ukraine
Postal system of Ukraine
Telecommunications companies established in 1947
Transport companies established in 1947
Telecommunications companies of Ukraine